Mulgrave may refer to:

Australia

New South Wales 
Mulgrave, New South Wales, a suburb of Sydney

Queensland 
Mulgrave, Queensland, a locality in the Shire of Burdekin
Mulgrave, a former name of Gordonvale, Queensland
Mulgrave Island, alternative name for Badu Island
Electoral district of Mulgrave (Queensland)

Victoria 
Mulgrave, Victoria, a suburb of Melbourne
Electoral district of Mulgrave (Victoria)

Canada
Mulgrave, Nova Scotia, a town
Mulgrave School, in West Vancouver, British Columbia

England
Mulgrave Castle, Whitby, Yorkshire

People
 Earl of Mulgrave, a hereditary title
 Henry Phipps, 1st Earl of Mulgrave (1755–1831), British soldier and politician
 Edmund Sheffield, 2nd Earl of Mulgrave (1611–1658), English peer
 John Sheffield, 3rd Earl of Mulgrave (1648–1721), British poet and Tory politician
 Constantine Phipps, 2nd Baron Mulgrave (1744–1792), British naval officer and explorer

Other uses
, a ship launched in 1813 and wrecked in 1829
Port Mulgrave (disambiguation), a number of places with this name